Action Man ("The Sun of Thieves"; , lit. "Heist of the Century") is a 1967 French–Italian crime thriller film directed by Jean Delannoy.

The movie screened at the Venice Film Festival.

Plot 

Denis Ferrand (Jean Gabin), a retired gangster in his sixties, whiles away his days with his wife Marie-Jeanne on a peaceful countryside estate. He is the owner of the quiet Domino bar, managed by Betty (Margaret Lee), and an inn named La Chaumière.

Ferrand's attention is caught by the Crédit Industriel du Nord bank office across the street from his bar. He keeps a watchful eye on all the comings and goings at the bank, learning the date when a security convoy is due to arrive with the pay for nuclear power plant workers in nearby Farville. Out of boredom and longing for his life of crime, Ferrand works out a plan for a robbery. While he is fine-tuning his idea, he receives an unexpected visit from Jim Beckley (Robert Stack). An old friend of Ferrand's from Saigon, Beckley is seeking refuge from a smuggling gang. Ferrand decides to kill two birds with one stone: provide shelter for Beckley and employ him in his heist plan.

Cast 
 Jean Gabin as Denis Ferrand
 Robert Stack as Jim Beckley
 Suzanne Flon as Marie-Jeanne Ferrand
 Margaret Lee as Betty
 Jean Topart as Mr Henri
 Walter Giller as Maurice Labrousse
 Lucienne Bogaert as old woman
 Georges Aminel as Commissaire Leduc
 Albert Michel as Gaston
  as security guard
 Bernard Musson as Mr Goulette
  as Ange Peresi
 Mino Doro as Luigi Savani
  as an accomplice
  as a criminal

References

External links 

1960s crime thriller films
1960s heist films
Films about bank robbery
Films about friendship
Films about old age
Films based on American crime novels
French crime thriller films
French heist films
Italian crime thriller films
Italian heist films
1960s French-language films
1960s French films
1960s Italian films